The 1990 Texas Longhorns football team represented the University of Texas at Austin during the 1990 NCAA Division I-A football season. They were represented in the Southwest Conference. They played their home games at Texas Memorial Stadium in Austin, Texas. The team was led by head coach David McWilliams.

Schedule

Personnel

Game summaries

Penn State

Colorado

Rice

Oklahoma

Arkansas

SMU

Texas Tech

Houston

TCU

Baylor

Texas A&M

Miami (FL) (Cotton Bowl)

References

Texas
Texas Longhorns football seasons
Southwest Conference football champion seasons
Texas Longhorns football